Pittosporum goetzei is a species of plant in the Pittosporaceae family. It is endemic to Tanzania.

References

goetzei
Endemic flora of Tanzania
Vulnerable flora of Africa
Taxonomy articles created by Polbot
Plants described in 1900